Bernard Foster (born 28 September 1931) is a British boxer. He competed in the men's light middleweight event at the 1952 Summer Olympics.

Foster won the 1952 and 1955 Amateur Boxing Association British light-middleweight title, when boxing out of the Mitchell & Butlers ABC.

References

External links
 

1931 births
Living people
British male boxers
Olympic boxers of Great Britain
Boxers at the 1952 Summer Olympics
Place of birth missing (living people)
Light-middleweight boxers